Loy Wayne Young (January 21, 1923 – March 25, 2015) was an American football and basketball coach.  Young was the fifth head football coach  at Dickinson State College—now known as Dickinson State University–in Dickinson, North Dakota, and held that position for one season, in 1950. His coaching record at Dickinson State was 5–2–1.  Young was also the head basketball coach at Chadron State College from 1951 to 1956, tallying a mark of 84–37.

References

1923 births
2015 deaths
American men's basketball players
Chadron State Eagles men's basketball coaches
College men's basketball head coaches in the United States
Dickinson State Blue Hawks football coaches
Minnesota State Mavericks men's basketball players
People from Sumner, Iowa
Basketball coaches from Iowa
Basketball players from Iowa

Minnesota State University, Mankato alumni